The Casio CTK-2080 VK3 is a polyphonic electronic keyboard workstation manufactured by Casio Computer Co., Ltd. As an installment in the long-running CTK series, the keyboard is primarily intended for entry-level keyboard players.

Architecture
The Casio CTK-2080 has pressure-sensitive features, LC display, 400 different tones that can be altered by various effects settings, a metronome, and 110 built-in songs. The keyboard also supports both MIDI and USB ports, allowing connection to computers, as well as other instruments. The keyboard can also digitally sample external sounds.

See also
List of Casio Musical Instruments

References

External links
Customer Support for Casio CTK-2080
Official Casio website

Casio musical instruments
Casio synthesizers
Electronic musical instruments
Polyphonic synthesizers
Digital synthesizers
Virtual analog synthesizers
Workstations